Dichomeris viridescens is a moth in the family Gelechiidae. It was described by Edward Meyrick in 1918. It is found in Assam, India.

The forewings are lilac grey with a dark purplish median streak from the base to one-fourth and a greyish-blue blotch in the disc at one-third, extending suffusedly almost to the dorsum. There is a broad rather oblique greyish-blue fasciate patch in the disc beyond the middle, extending nearly to the margins. The discal space before this and a fascia beyond it are rather dark purplish fuscous with deep emerald-green reflections. Beyond this is a metallic-blue trapezoidal blotch occupying the apical and terminal areas, preceded on the costa by a triangular blackish spot before which is a white mark. The hindwings are dull ochreous, the apical fourth suffused with dark fuscous and with a large basal patch of modified light grey fine scales.

References

Moths described in 1918
viridescens